Derrick Brandon Jones (born November 14, 1984) is a former American football defensive end. He was signed by the Pittsburgh Steelers as an undrafted free agent in 2007. He played college football at Grand Valley State.

Jones was also a member of the Atlanta Falcons, Tennessee Titans, Buffalo Bills, Miami Dolphins and San Diego Chargers. He is a cousin of former Cincinnati Reds outfielder Eric Davis.

External links
Buffalo Bills bio
Grand Valley State Lakers bio
Pittsburgh Steelers bio
San Diego Chargers bio

1984 births
Living people
Sportspeople from San Bernardino County, California
American football defensive tackles
American football defensive ends
Grand Valley State Lakers football players
People from Barstow, California
Pittsburgh Steelers players
Players of American football from California
Atlanta Falcons players
Buffalo Bills players
Tennessee Titans players
Miami Dolphins players
San Diego Chargers players